Bitoscanate is an organic chemical compound used in the treatment of hookworms. It is classified as an extremely hazardous substance in the United States as defined in Section 302 of the U.S. Emergency Planning and Community Right-to-Know Act (42 U.S.C. 11002), and is subject to strict reporting requirements by facilities which produce, store, or use it in significant quantities.

References

External links
 4885 at NOAA CAMEO

Anthelmintics
Isothiocyanates